Margaret Anne "Peggy" Moffitt (born May 14, 1940) is a former American model and actress. During the 1960s, she worked very closely with fashion designer Rudi Gernreich, and developed a signature style that featured heavy makeup and an asymmetrical hair cut.

Career

Modeling 
Though her unique look has now become widely recognized, Moffitt began her a career as an actress, beginning with an uncredited role in the 1955 film  You're Never Too Young.  She first began modeling in Paris in the 1950s.

During the 1960s, she developed a signature style, including false eyelashes and heavy eye makeup. Her hairstyle, an asymmetrical bowl cut, created by Vidal Sassoon, became known as the "five point".  Her unique look became an icon of the 1960s fashion scene.

Gernreich, Moffitt, and Claxton 

Gernreich collaborated with Moffitt and her husband, photographer William Claxton. The three became "a dynamic and inseparable trio." “Without Rudi I would have been a gifted and innovative model,” explained Moffitt in The Rudi Gernreich Book. “Without me he would have been an avant-garde designer of genius. We made each other better. We were each other’s catalyst.... It was fun, it was invigorating, it was a true collaboration, and yes, it was love.” Moffit was later described as his muse.

Monokini 

Gernreich first conceived of a topless swimsuit in December 1962, but didn't intend to produce the design commercially. It had more meaning to Gernreich as an idea than as a reality. Gernreich had Moffitt model the suit in person for Diana Vreeland of Vogue, who asked him why he conceived of the design. Gernreich told her he felt it was time for "freedom-in fashion as well as every other facet of life," but that the swimsuit was just a statement. "[Women] drop their bikini tops already," he said, "so it seemed like the natural next step."  She told him, "If there's a picture of it, it's an actuality. You must make it." Gernreich decided to call his design a monokini. When a photo shoot was arranged on Montego Bay in the Bahamas, all five models hired for the session refused to wear the design. The photographer finally persuaded an adventurous local to model it.

To avoid sensationalizing the design, Moffitt, her husband and photographer, William Claxton, and Gernreich decided to publish their own pictures for the fashion press and news media. Moffitt was initially resistant to the idea of posing topless, and afraid the photograph and ensuing coverage could get out of control. She said,

Look was the first to publish, after LIFE refused, a rear view of Moffitt modeling the swimsuit on June 2, 1964, and the following day columnist Carol Bjorkman of Women's Wear Daily published a frontal view picture of Moffitt wearing the suit. The photograph became a world-wide news event. It became a celebrated image of the extremism of 1960s designs. Moffit later said, "It was a political statement. It wasn't meant to be worn in public."

Moffitt tired of the single-minded attention to the images of her modeling the Monokini.  In 2012, she said of the image, "The shot seen around the world. Think of something in your life that took 1/60th of a second to do. Now, imagine having to spend the rest of your life talking about it. I think it's a beautiful photograph, but oh, am I tired of talking about it.”

Later work 

In 1985, the Los Angeles Fashion Group staged a Gernreich retrospective, "Looking Back at a Futurist." They wanted a woman to model the monokini, but Moffitt loudly objected because she felt it would exploit Gernreich's intentions. After Gernreich's death, she retained legal rights to his designs and arranged for his designs to be displayed in an exhibition titled The Total Look: The Creative Collaboration Between Rudi Gernreich, Peggy Moffitt, and William Claxton at the Los Angeles Museum of Contemporary Art's Pacific Design Center. She also collaborated with Marylou Luther and her husband to release a comprehensive book chronicling Gernreich's designs.

Personal life 

Moffit married photographer William Claxton in 1960. The couple had a son, Christopher. They remained married until Claxton's death in October 2008.

In popular culture 

The Chicago band The Handcuffs feature the song "Peggy Moffitt" on their 2006 debut album Model for a Revolution,  with iconic photographs of Moffitt on the CD cover.

Boyd Rice and Giddle Partridge released a limited edition vinyl recording called Going Steady With Peggy Moffitt in 2008.

Filmography

References

Further reading 

 Peggy Moffitt, William Claxton: The Rudy Gernreich Book, Rizzoli International Publications (1991)

External links 

 

1940 births
Actresses from Los Angeles
Female models from California
American film actresses
American television actresses
Living people
Models from Los Angeles
21st-century American women